Spodsbjerg is a village in south Denmark, located in Langeland Municipality on the island of Langeland in Region of Southern Denmark.

References

Cities and towns in the Region of Southern Denmark
Langeland Municipality
Villages in Denmark